Spalax is a record label in France that specializes in progressive rock and experimental music, it features a huge krautrock catalog too.  Spalax music re-released, among others, albums by Amon Düül, Cluster, Harmonia, Popol Vuh, Annexus Quam, and Bernard Szajner.

See also
 List of record labels

French record labels
Progressive rock record labels
Experimental music record labels
Reissue record labels